Frederick Charles of Württemberg-Winnental (12 September 1652 – 20 December 1697) was since 1677 Duke of the new-founded line of Württemberg-Winnental and regent of the infant Duke Eberhard Ludwig.

Biography
Born on 12 September 1652 at Stuttgart, Frederick Charles was the second son of Eberhard III, Duke of Württemberg and Anna Catharina von Salm-Kyrburg.

On 27 November 1677 he was given the regency over his nephew after the death of his older brother and with that the regency over Württemberg.
This ended on 22 January 1693 when Eberhard Ludwig reached the age of majority.
Out of recognition he received a large sum of money and was appointed Generalfeldmarschall by the Kaiser.

Frederick Charles fought against the French on the Rhine in the War of the Grand Alliance under Louis William, Margrave of Baden-Baden.
On 27 September 1692, an imperial army unit of 4,000 cavalry men under his command was attacked by surprise in their camp in Ötisheim near Mühlacker. They withdrew hastily and lost several hundred men, either killed or captured by the French. The Duke himself was among the prisoners, but was released soon after.

He fell ill in 1696 of syphilis and died the next year in Stuttgart.

Marriage and children
Frederick Charles married on 31 October 1682 Margravine Eleonore Juliane of Brandenburg-Ansbach (1663–1724), daughter of Albert II, Margrave of Brandenburg-Ansbach.

They had seven children :
 Charles Alexander (1684–1737), who would become the 11th Duke of Württemberg.
 Dorothea Charlotte (1685–1687)
 Frederick Charles (1686–1693)
 Henry Frederick (1687–1734), served in the Dutch army until 1713.
 Maximilian Emanuel (1689–1709), volunteer in the army of Charles XII of Sweden and a devoted friend to the king.
 Frederick Louis (1690 - killed September 19, 1734) at the Battle of Guastalla. He married on October 22, 1722 Ursula von Alten Brockum (November 25, 1680 - May 4, 1743).
 Christiane Charlotte (1694–1729) - married William Frederick, Margrave of Brandenburg-Ansbach

Ancestry

References

 – Friedrich I von Sachsen-Altenburg to Gering

External links

1652 births
1697 deaths
17th-century dukes of Württemberg
17th-century German military personnel
Nobility from Stuttgart
Deaths from syphilis
Field marshals of the Holy Roman Empire